Liu Bocheng (December 4, 1892 – October 7, 1986) was a Chinese military commander and Marshal of the People's Liberation Army.

Liu is known as the 'half' of the "Three and A Half" Strategists of China in modern history. (The other three are Lin Biao, commander of the CPC, and Kuomintang commander Bai Chongxi, and CPC commander Su Yu.) Officially, Liu was recognised as a revolutionary, military strategist and theoretician, and one of the founders of the People's Liberation Army. Liu's nicknames, Chinese Mars , The Kutuzov of China and The One-eyed Dragon, also reflect his character, military achievement, Soviet officer education and the fact that he lost his right eye in battle.

Early life
Liu was born to a peasant family in Kaixian, Sichuan (the site is currently submerged by the Three Gorges Dam). Influenced by the revolutionary theories of Sun Yat-sen, he later decided to dedicate himself to the cause of establishing a democratic and modern China.

In 1911, Liu joined the Boy Scouts in support of the Xinhai Revolution. In the following year, he enrolled in the Chongqing Military Academy and later joined the army against Yuan Shikai, who was planning to undermine the Xinhai Revolution and proclaim himself Emperor. In 1914, Liu joined Sun Yat-sen's party and gained extensive military experience.

During one battle during this period he captured 10,000 enemy soldiers, for which he was promoted to brigade commander.
In 1916, he lost his right eye in a battle for Fengdu county, Sichuan. After he lost the eye he gained the nickname "One-Eyed Dragon". Alternative accounts of how Liu lost his eye have included the speculation that he lost it either earlier, in the 1911 Xinhai Revolution, or later, during the Long March.

In 1923, during a war against the warlord Wu Peifu, in response to the Northern Expedition of the Kuomintang, Liu was appointed commander of the Eastern Route, and later was promoted to commanding general in Sichuan.

While fighting the army of Long Yun, a Yunnan warlord, Liu defeated a force commanded by Zhu De, who would later become one of his closest comrades in the Red Army. Their relationship marked Liu's first real exposure to the theory and practice of Communism. In May 1926, Liu joined the CPC and was appointed military commissioner of Chongqing. In December 1926, along with Zhu De and Yang, Liu masterminded the Luzhou and Nanchong uprising, fought against local warlords, while supporting the Northern Expedition.

In 1927, Liu was appointed army corps commander of the 15th Temporarily Organized National Revolutionary Army. It was during this time that Liu witnessed the split between the Kuomintang and the CPC. After joining the CPC, Liu led the Nanchang Uprising together with Zhu De, He Long, Ye Ting, Li Lisan and Zhou Enlai, effectively declaring war on the KMT.

During this uprising, Liu was appointed the first chief of staff of the newly born Chinese Red Army. However, after a series of defeats Liu's forces were destroyed, and its leaders went underground. In 1927 Liu was selected to travel to Moscow, where he mastered Russian and attended the prestigious M. V. Frunze Military Academy. While studying in the Soviet Union he learned conventional, Western-style military tactics. While in Russia he translated a Russian textbook into Chinese, Combined Arms Tactics, produced a commentary of Sun Tzu's Art of War, both of which promoted conventional tactics. Later on, Liu gave a lecture on the subject at the 6th National Congress of the Chinese Communist Party, which was held in Moscow.

Commander of the CPC Army
In the summer of 1930, Liu was sent back to China and was appointed as commissioner of the Central Military Committee of the CPC as well as Military Secretary of the Yangtze River division of the CPC. In December 1930, Liu went to Shanghai to assist Zhou Enlai in the daily administration of CPC military affairs.

In 1931, the CPC suffered great losses in several major cities and was forced to retreat to the countryside. Liu was sent to the Central Soviet Territory, the CPC's power base in Jiangxi. In January 1932, Liu was appointed president and commissar of the Red Army Military Academy. By October he was promoted to Chief of Staff of the Red Army, assisting Zhu De and Zhou in the war against Chiang Kai-shek’s 4th Suppression on the Central Soviet Territory.

At the time, members of the 28 Bolsheviks, including Bo Gu, Zhang Wentian, and Otto Braun (also known by his Chinese name, Li De), the Military Advisor of Comintern, took control of military command and Party leadership. All three were educated in Moscow, and Liu found common ground with these young men. During his time in the Jiangxi-Fujian Soviet (and during the subsequent Long March) Liu experienced conflicts with other Communist leaders, including Mao Zedong and Peng Dehuai.

Liu's conflict with Mao may partly be due to Liu's support for conventional tactics, which contradicted Mao's advocacy of guerrilla warfare. According to a later account by Zhang Guotao, Liu described Mao as being a "pedant", and resented Mao's tendency to micromanage his military officers, rather than delegating authority to Red Army's general staff. Peng once led his troops during a siege of Guangchang under the orders of Bo and Li De, which resulted in the troops suffering heavy casualties. Peng blamed this on his army's inferior weaponry and resources. Peng was known for being outspoken and bad-tempered. After the battle Peng became furious, leading him into direct conflict with Liu.

Liu grew to oppose the leadership of Bo and Braun later, after the Red Army began to suffer repeated defeats. In the Red Army's endeavour against the KMT's Fifth Encirclement Campaign, Liu was demoted to Chief of Staff of the 5th Field Army following his dissidence with Bo and Braun. Bo and Braun led by way of doctrine and extremism, and the Red Army waged a face-to-face general war against the better-equipped and larger KMT army. Failure was inevitable; the CPC had to retreat from its territory to seek refuge, marking the beginning of the Long March.

During the Long March, near the end of 1934, Liu was reappointed as Chief of the General Staff of the Red Army and commander of Central Column, which consisted of the majority of the CPC senior leaders, such as Bo, Braun, Zhou and Mao. Liu led the army across the Wu River and took control of Zunyi, a county of Guizhou province. It was in this small city that the famous Zunyi Conference was held in January 1935. During this conference, Liu and most of the attendees showed their support for Mao.

As a result of this conference, Bo, who was then Braun's command in military, was replaced by a new three-man team consisting of Mao, Zhou and Wang Jiaxiang. Later on, Liu assisted Mao and Zhu across the Red Water River four times. Liu himself led troops in the takeover of the Jiaopin ferry, securing the route across the Jinsha River for the major troops. In May, Liu was appointed commander of avant-courier army and worked with commissar Nie Rongzhen on securing the route for the remaining troops. When his army entered the ethnic settlement areas, Liu pledged brotherhood with a chieftain of the local Yi ethnicity, which significantly reduced the minorities’ hostility towards the CPC. Liu then led the 1st Division of the Red Army across the Dadu River, where Chiang plotted to have the CPC armies annihilated, in the same manner as Shi Dakai and his army's road to perdition almost a century before.

When Mao's 1st Red Army later united with Zhang Guotao’s 4th Red Army, Liu stayed Chief of Staff. During a dispute between Mao and Zhang over major issues, which led to their later split, Liu maintained his support for Mao. By the time they reached Yan'an, it was obvious that Mao was the winner.

War with Japan

In 1936, after the Xi'an Incident, Chiang agreed to set up an alliance with the CPC in the fight against Japanese invaders. On July 7, 1937, after the Marco Polo Bridge Incident, general war between China and Japan broke out. Under the agreement with Chiang, CPC armies were reorganised into 8th Route Army, and Liu was appointed commander of the 129th Division, one of its three divisions. It was then that he began his long cooperation with Deng Xiaoping, his commissar at that time.

According to the orthodox record of the CCP, their cooperation and friendship lasted more than five decades. Their respective military and political talents complemented the other's perfectly, and there was a very high level of trust between them. They were said to have formed a perfect pair.

However, their true relationship might not have been as close as it seemed. Firstly, Mao distrusted most of his generals, and sent his associates out as commissars to supervise these generals. Deng, who was Mao's close associate from 1930's when he worked in Jiangxi, was sent out for Liu, and Luo Ronghuan for Lin Biao. Secondly, in contrast to Liu's role as a professional soldier, Deng was a political activist and knew little about the military. Their personalities and personal lives were vastly different, which might have posed a barrier to their becoming true friends.

Liu, Deng and Deputy Commander Xu Xiangqian led their troops to Shanxi, and carried out bushfighting around Taihang Mountain. After rounds of successful battles against the Japanese army, they set up the Jin–Ji–Yu Base Area which consisted of parts of Shanxi, Hebei and Henan. In 1940, Liu led his division in the Hundred Regiments Campaign, a major campaign led by Peng to breach the blockage on CPC base areas enforced by Japanese forces under the command of General Okamura Yasuji. At the same time, Liu integrated regular forces with militia, using frontal attack and bushfighting to frustrate the Japanese army's suppression and clean-out efforts. The Japanese were so irritated that they sent agents to assassinate Liu. Although their mission was a failure, they did succeed in murdering Liu's first daughter when she was kept in kindergarten. The Japanese thought that this revenge might distract Liu, but they underestimated Liu's willpower. His heightened loathing for the Japanese gave him more courage under fire and more inspiration in command.

In 1943, Liu was called back to Yan'an for Zheng Feng. He pledged his allegiance to Mao and supported Mao's power struggle with Wang Ming. On the contrary, Peng stood by Wang and as a result fell out of favour with Mao. (Despite this, Liu was still labelled a dogmatist for pursuing his studies in Russia, and he had to make a public apology against his will in 1959.) In 1945, Liu attended the 7th National Congress of the CPC in Yan'an, and prepared the counterattack against the Japanese and the forthcoming civil war with KMT armies.

Chinese Civil War
At the end of the war against the Japanese, the war-scourged Chinese people pleaded for peace. Chiang then invited Mao to Chongqing for peace talks, during which, Yan Xishan sent his armies to attack CPC territories in Shanxi under Chiang's authorisation. Liu and Deng led the Shangdang Campaign and defeated 13 divisions of Yan's troops totaled more than 35,000, and then headed east and annihilated another of Yan's army corps in the Handan Campaign. These two campaigns were the first experiences of the CPC army's shift from bushfight to campaign in movement, and proved to be valuable practice for the army groups campaign of CPC armies. They assisted in the CPC's quick occupation of Manchuria, and won advantageous status for Mao and his peace talk delegation in Chongqing. Under immense pressure, Chiang was forced to sign a peace agreement with Mao in October 1945.

The peace, however, was fragile, and civil war broke out in 1946. Liu and Deng led several campaigns in movement, undermining the strategic attack of KMT armies. In 1947, when the territories controlled by the CPC could no longer sustain so many troops, Mao decided to send part of his army to the territories controlled by KMT, in order to relieve the heavy burden on his own territories, and to position enemies at the gates of the KMT. He ordered Liu and Deng to lead their armies from their northern China base in Henan, Shanxi and Hebei, to Anhui in southern China. This involved sending 100,000 soldiers across the Yellow River, and marching over 1,000 kilometers into central plain. Liu and Deng both saw it as a gamble rather than a strategic move, and even Mao himself was not certain if such gamble would pay off by openly discussing the three possible outcomes: 
 The communist force could not even reach Dabie Shan.
 The communist force would be driven out by the Kuomintang force after reaching Dabie Shan.
 The communist force would be able to establish new base in Dabie Mountain.

Although many expressed their concerns, Mao would not change his mind. During the expedition, they faced elite KMT armies. Liu launched the Southwestern Shandong Campaign defeating over nine brigades of KMT troops. Under this plot and cover, Liu's army promptly moved south and went into the Dabie Mountain areas. Liu's armies suffered great losses; half of the troops were wiped out and all of their heavy artilleries were lost, which greatly weakened their military abilities in later campaigns.  Liu and Deng's troops survived further rounds of attack. Far away from the power base, with few support armies and supplies, Liu led self-sufficient soldiers and broke rounds of heavy blockade, while boosting his strength back to the original 100,000.  Mao and his associates were very impressed by Liu's achievement and it was only then did they begin to maintain that the direct threat to Nanjing and Wuhan was a great achievement; a knife into the heart of KMT governance.  Liu's success indeed forced the nationalists to redeploy nearly two dozen brigades against him, disrupting Chiang Kai-shek's original plan, thus relieved nationalist pressure on other communist forces.  Mao's gamble had paid off with Liu's clever military strategies.

Liu's success did not end there, he carried out to expand his initial victories over the nationalists by carrying out several campaigns with armies led by Chen Yi and Su Yu, another army led by Chen Geng, to annihilate a great number of KMT troops led by two prominent generals, Chen Cheng and Bai Chongxi. After ten months of hard work, Liu and Deng had significantly enlarged the area of central plain area occupied by the CPC, and forced the KMT armies into strategic defense, as Chiang no longer had enough troops for attack. In Nov 1948, Liu, Deng, Chen, Su and Tan Zhenlin together formed the Military Committee to command the massive Huai Hai Campaign, which was carried out by CPC troops in East China and the central plain to fight against the KMT main forces in Xuzhou and Anhui. In this decisive battle, more than 500,000 KMT soldiers were annihilated; among the POWs was General Du Yuming, Chiang's most distinguished protégé.

In April 1949, after illusive peace talks between the CPC and the KMT were broken, Liu led his armies across the Yangtze River and conquered huge areas of Anhui, Zhejiang, Jiangxi and Fujian, taking over Nanjing, the capital of the KMT. Liu was appointed mayor of Nanjing for a short while. With assistance from He Long, Liu and Deng launched new campaigns to conquer vast areas in Southwestern China, by using long distance bypass and siege strategies. Among the areas conquered were his and Deng's own hometowns, Sichuan, Guizhou, Yunnan and Xikang.

After the Establishment of the PRC
On October 1, 1949, Mao announced the establishment of the People’s Republic of China. During the ceremony, Liu stood next to Mao. This marked the peak of his career as a military commander. In January 1950, Liu was appointed chairman of the Southwestern Division of the Central People's Government of PRC, together with Gao Gang, Rao Shushi, Peng and Lin Biao. The rewards of conquering southwestern China, however, proved only to be temporary. Mao soon sent his favorite general He Long to work alongside Liu, to supervise and share the power with Liu. During his short tenure as governor, Liu led his soldiers in the crackdown of bandits and restored law and order, oversaw economic development, and more importantly, made plans for the communist invasion of Tibet.

Towards the end of 1950, Liu was transferred to Nanjing as president and commissar of the Military Academy of the PLA, which would be considered a demotion for Liu. There were no clear or generally accepted reasons on record for his falling out of favour. One popular opinion holds that, during the long period of time that Liu worked with or under Mao, he never really earned Mao's trust. Liu himself knew that too. From the Chinese history, he learnt that most generals that helped establish a new dynasty ended up getting killed by the suspicious Emperor. In order to prevent that from happening on himself, he tried to stay as far away from politics as possible. Because of his early year military training in Soviet Union, he used that as an excuse to quit his job in the government and become the president and commissar of the Military Academy of the PLA. Mao approved his request. The other story says that, while Liu was still chairman, someone unknown to the public submitted a biography of Liu in support of his promotion. In this biography he described Liu as an offspring of Liu Bang, founder and first emperor of the Han Dynasty, and hinted that Liu himself could set up his own empire as his ancestor did. Knowing of the cruelties and conspiracies in Chinese history, Liu was worried instead of happy, because he knew that it would arouse Mao's suspicions over Liu's intentions. Although Liu had this man arrested, Mao still learnt of the event, and Liu's worries eventually turned into reality. This only served to further increase Mao's long-time distrust of Liu.

Despite the demotion, Liu was dedicated to his new job, attempting to bring what he learned during his years in the Soviet Union to the academy. He organised the translations of numerous military textbooks from the Soviet Union and other countries, introducing major campaigns from ancient times to World War II to students, and sowing the seeds of the PLA's evolution into a modern army. Although Liu was appointed vice-chairman of the Central Military Committee of the CPC and PRC in 1954 as a reward for his contributions, these titles did not promise real power as Peng's did. (Peng was appointed defense minister for his battle achievements in the Korean War.) In 1955, Liu attained the rank of field marshal, ranking as the 4th amongst 10 field marshals of the PLA, next to Zhu De, Peng and Lin Biao.

In 1956, after Nikita Khrushchev shook the Communist world by making his famous Secret Speech denouncing the cult of personality that surrounded Joseph Stalin, Mao wanted to ensure that a similar incident within the CPC would not happen. He wrote an article, "On Ten Relationships", arguing that the CPC should learn from foreign countries selectively, analytically and with criticism. The CPC center then issued documents to call on all CPC members to overcome the trend of dogmatism and empiricism at work. Investigations and purges were carried out by the military, under the direction of Peng. As an advocate of learning from other countries, Liu became a key target. Some of his subordinates and deputies, including General Xiao Ke, were censored and kept in custody. Liu had to make numerous self-criticisms for his association and support of these officials. Under heavy pressure, his health worsened (he eventually lost all sight in his remaining eye), and he finally submitted his resignation as president.

In 1959, Liu left Nanjing for Beijing and lived in half-reclusion. Although he was since elected as member of the Politburo in the 8th to 11th National Congress of the CPC, Vice-chairman of the 2nd to 5th Standing Committee of the National People’s Congress, and all the while holding the title of vice-chairman of the Military Committee, he did not participate very much in politics, citing health problems as a reason for his absence. This saved him from the following rounds of purges carried out by Mao. Peng, however, was not as fortunate. He was purged in the Lushan Conference in 1959 and later tortured to death during the Cultural Revolution.

By the time of the Cultural Revolution, Liu had become completely blind. Nonetheless, he survived the purges and witnessed his long-time friend Deng returning to power again. He supported Deng in the power struggle against Mao's widow, Jiang Qing, and her Gang of Four, and also advocated Deng's policy of reforming and opening up China to the outside world, a policy that Liu himself had practiced in the academy decades ago.

In 1982, Liu retired due to worsening health problems. This gave Deng a boost in his calling for the retirement of aging leaders in order to clear the way for younger leaders of the CPC. On October 7, 1986, Liu died in Beijing, at the age of 94. In the lament given to him, Liu was rehabilitated and cleared of all charges against him during the movements against dogmatism.

Anecdotes
During the Fengdu campaign in 1916, Liu was hit by a bullet in the head, which passed through his right temple and went out from his right eye.  A German surgeon performed surgery to remove the eyeball and debride necrotic tissues. To keep his brain nerves from being damaged by the anaesthetics, Liu insisted on operation without anesthesia. After the procedure was finished, Liu told the surgeon that he counted a total of 72 cuts. The doctor was greatly moved by this display of courage and perseverance, and out of great respect he gave Liu the nickname "Chinese Mars".

Deng's famous “Cats Theory” (“Whether it is a black cat or a white cat, as long as it can catch the rat, it is a good cat”), in fact, originated from Liu. During his long military career, Liu often stated that “Whether it is a black cat or a yellow cat, as long as it can catch the rat, it is a good cat” to demonstrate that the purpose of war is to win, no matter what strategies you take.

Liu and Deng's relationship grew strong only after the communist takeover because both were discontent with Mao Zedong's disastrous policies, such as Great Leap Forward and Cultural Revolution: As Liu was persecuted in the late 1950s, Deng showed his support to Liu, as the latter was making rounds of analyses and apologies for the so-called "dogmatism" and "empiricism". Similarly, Liu showed his support to Deng for Deng's economic policy in the early 1960s to reform the Chinese economy.

Deng's entire family attended Liu's funeral, which only happened in the case of very close family ties in traditional Chinese culture. Liu wanted a small funeral in the hospital he died in. However, because too many military and political leaders requested to attend the funeral, the funeral was moved to a bigger hall.

False anecdotes
Liu and Deng's relationship was greatly exaggerated by the Chinese general populace as a way to protest Mao Zedong's disastrous Cultural Revolution: In 1972, shortly after the death of Chinese Field Marshal Chen Yi, Liu told his family that after his death, he wanted his funeral to be held by Deng, and his eulogy to be done by Deng, and this was when Deng was still under house arrest and Liu did so to show his support.  However, the general Chinese populace had gravely turned this incident into something out of proportion as a way to protest the disastrous Cultural Revolution by claiming that after Hua Guofeng was named by Mao as his successor, Liu had requested a face-to-face conversation with Hua Guofeng, wanting his funeral to be held by Deng, and his eulogy to be done by Deng, or else he would rather have his son to throw his cadaver in the fields to feed the wild dogs.

In reality, there is no official record that Liu had made such an outrageous request, nor any face-to-face conversations with Hua, nor any formal request to the Chinese regime to have his funeral held by Deng and his eulogy done by Deng. However, it was definitely his personal wish which is revealed to his family.  This personal wish of Liu became a reality after his death as his family informed the Chinese regime about his wish, and by that time, Deng was already the paramount leader of China and nobody could stop him from honoring Liu's personal wish.

Legacy

Unlike other PLA marshals and generals, such as Peng Dehuai and Lin Biao, Liu never sought to win Chairman Mao's political trust and support, but on the other hand this prevented him from suffering from the backlash of a political fallout with Mao as did Peng and Lin did in 1959 and 1971, respectively. Liu earned his reputation and title through his own outstanding military skills and personality. He oversaw the development of the CPC armies’ expertise in regular battle, frontal attack, army groups campaigns, and sieges. Liu was also the first to introduce modern military strategies and the tactics of foreign countries to the CPC army, and incorporated science and artistry into military training. All of these endeavours shifted public perception of the CPC army from being a guerrilla force consisting of peasants and proletarians with little regular training to becoming a sophisticated and highly skilled modern military force.

See also 
 List of generals of the People's Republic of China

References

Citations

Sources 

 Barron, James. "Liu Bocheng, Military Leader in Two Chinese Revolutions". New York Times. October 10, 1986. Retrieved August 31, 2014. 
 Lew, Christopher R. The Third Chinese Revolutionary War, 1945–1949: An Analysis of Communist Strategy and Leadership. US and Canada: Routelage. 2009. . p. 12.
 Long March Leaders

1892 births
1986 deaths
Chinese Communist Party politicians from Chongqing
Marshals of the People's Republic of China
Mayors of Nanjing
Writers from Chongqing
People of the Chinese Civil War
Eighth Route Army generals
Chinese military writers
People's Republic of China writers
Frunze Military Academy alumni
People's Republic of China politicians from Chongqing
Chinese expatriates in the Soviet Union
Military strategists
Chinese people with disabilities
Members of the 11th Politburo of the Chinese Communist Party
Members of the 10th Politburo of the Chinese Communist Party
Members of the 9th Politburo of the Chinese Communist Party
Members of the 8th Politburo of the Chinese Communist Party
Vice Chairpersons of the National People's Congress